The Day the Laughter Died is a comedy double album by American comedian Andrew Dice Clay, released in 1990. It was produced by Rick Rubin, whose concept was to record an unadvertised performance in a small club with a small crowd, many of whom would not necessarily be fans of Clay's act. Clay chose a New York club owned by comedian Rodney Dangerfield, Dangerfield's, to record during the holiday season. A sequel, The Day the Laughter Died, Part II, was released in 1993.

The album is largely improvisational, with Clay interacting with the audience over the course of over an hour and a half. The topics run through his usual gamut of sex, relationships between men and women, masculinity and popular culture. Unlike his prior recordings, the jokes are delivered intentionally flat and raw as to offend and alienate the audience, turning the performance into the joke itself.

Track listing

Disc one 
 "First Kiss" – 2:11
 "Holiday Season" – 1:50
 "The Tree" – 1:20
 "Texas" – 3:05
 "Places To Meet Chicks" – 3:07
 "The Gift" – 1:40
 "The Divider" – 2:11
 "Personal Delivery Service" – 3:52
 "Female Anatomy" – 3:42
 "Under 2 Minutes" – 3:30
 "Kids" – 2:01
 "Mothers, Daughters & Sisters" – 2:49
 "1990" – 2:13
 "Jerkin' Off" – 1:20
 "Milk & Shampoo" – 5:39
 "Laughter vs. Comedy" – 1:07
 "While The Cats Away..." – 3:19
 "What'll It Be" – 2:16
 "Pizza" – 1:49
 "Concave" – 1:07
 "Frozen Food" – 1:09

Disc two 
 "The Osmonds" – 4:24
 "Hot Mama" – 2:18
 "Turn-On Words" – 0:34
 "Rhyme Renditions" – 3:52
 "True Stories" – 0:41
 "Automatic Pilot" – 1:47
 "Dogs & Birds" – 2:49
 "Women Comics" – 3:20
 "Cigarettes" – 2:16
 "A History Lesson" – 2:00
 "Judy" – 3:34
 "Mother & Son" – 3:37
 "A+" – 2:47
 "What Did She Say?" – 1:15
 "Double Date" – 2:25
 "Multiple Sclerosis" – 0:27
 "How Are Ya?" – 0:50
 "Silence Is Golden" – 0:17
 "Hour Back...Get It?" – 6:40
 "Something Soft" – 4:44

References

External links 
[ AllMusic]

Andrew Dice Clay albums
1990 live albums
American Recordings (record label) live albums
Albums produced by Rick Rubin
1990s comedy albums
Live comedy albums
Spoken word albums by American artists
Live spoken word albums
Stand-up comedy albums